Ninnu Kori is a 2017 Indian Telugu-language romantic comedy drama film directed by debutant Shiva Nirvana from a screenplay written by Kona Venkat. Produced by DVV Danayya under DVV Entertainments, the film stars Nani, Nivetha Thomas and Aadhi Pinisetty while Murali Sharma and Tanikella Bharani play supporting roles. Gopi Sunder composed the music. Prawin Pudi and Karthik Ghattamaneni are the editor and cinematographer of the film respectively.

The plot revolves around Uma (Nani), Pallavi (Thomas), and Arun (Pinisetty). When Uma declines her proposal to elope, Pallavi marries Arun and emigrates to the US. Uma who still is in love with Pallavi also lands up in the US a year later in the hope of getting her back.

The film was commercially successful, grossing over 52 crore at the box office. A Tamil-language remake titled Thalli Pogathey was released in 2021.

Plot  
On the day of her first wedding anniversary, Pallavi, under the pretext of running errands for their party, travels to Los Angeles from her home in San Francisco without the knowledge of her husband Arun to meet Uma, her former lover.

One and a half years ago in Vizag, Pallavi is a student who wishes to make a recording of a dance performance so that she can show it to her family post marriage. However, a lack of natural talent forbids her from doing so. Uma Maheswara Rao, a young statistics student, is an orphan whose godfather Murthy, happens to be the principal of his institution. Uma wishes to pursue a Ph.D. in his subject and settle in life. Pallavi happens to spot him dancing at a friend's wedding and requests him to teach her. Uma agrees for the large fee she offers as he is in need of money. He helps her, not only with her dancing but also with other issues, including confronting a bully who torments her. Pallavi wins a dancing competition and the two realize they are in love with each other.

Pallavi tactfully clears the penthouse her family owns so that Uma can stay in the same house as her. Uma starts giving tutoring classes in the penthouse and earns the money he requires. When Pallavi's family starts looking for marriage alliances, she requests Uma to elope with her, and he reluctantly agrees. However, a chance encounter with Pallavi's father, Chandramouli, makes Uma realize that he is ineligible to marry her as he hasn't fully settled in life. Taking this to heart, he requests Pallavi to allow him to go to New Delhi and get a Ph.D., thereby securing a future for both of them. Pallavi allows him tearfully, and he leaves for Delhi. For the next few months, she continuously ignores Uma, who keeps trying to contact her. She is soon approached for marriage by Arun's family, and her family agrees. When Pallavi contacts Uma, she realizes that she is not ready to take the guilt if he blames her later on for the failure in his career, and unwillingly marries Arun. A year later, Pallavi is contacted by Prof. Murthy who informs her that Uma has gone into depression and is now an alcoholic. He is on the verge of being fired by his firm in Los Angeles and is spiraling toward a self-destructive path. Feeling responsible, Pallavi travels to meet Uma.

Back in the present, Pallavi tells Uma that she is happily married to Arun and does not wish to go back with Uma. Uma objects saying she still loves him and is leading an unhappy life. Back in San Francisco, Pallavi tells Arun about her encounter and tells him they should call Uma to their house for 10 days so he can see how happy they are. She contacts Uma, who tells her that if he fails to see the love between her and Arun, she would have to go away with him. Pallavi, initially hesitant, agrees. Uma lands in San Francisco, and immediately strikes an awkward relationship with Arun. He repetitively irks the couple and mocks their relationship, which annoys Pallavi. However, Arun's colleagues take a liking to Uma, whose pessimistic nature offends a few other people. This is soon disrupted when Chandramouli and his son-in-law, Lovababu, unexpectedly land in San Francisco. Uma is introduced as Arun's old classmate and is made to promise Pallavi that he would not reveal his actual reason for being there. Chandramouli reveals to Uma that the daughter of his friend committed suicide after having been married off to a man she doesn't love instead of her lover. He had come to know on the wedding day that Pallavi had a lover from Kavita, Pallavi's best friend. Doubting that Pallavi is unhappy with her marriage, he came to San Francisco to find her former lover so that he could get them married if she wanted. Uma, realizing his advantage, indirectly begins to coax Chandramouli and Lovababu into finding the truth themselves. When Kavita is interrogated, she covers up with a fake story saying that the lover is married and Pallavi herself tells her father that she is happy. They all go for a trip to Santa Monica for Arun's business meeting. There Pallavi discovers that Arun is having an affair after seeing him hug another girl secretively in the parking lot. Chandramouli too finds out about Uma from a phone call with Arun's father and Kavita. Pallavi confronts Arun, who lies to her again, confirming to her his infidelity. She confides in Uma, who believes she now hates Arun and wishes to be with him instead. However, when Chandramouli tells Uma that he wishes to get Pallavi married to Uma a few days later, he tells Chandramouli about his encounter with Arun. Having been an introvert since childhood, Arun's first friend was Christie, who he met during his MBA. Her attitude towards him makes him feel he has found a best friend. She unexpectedly proposes to him one day, and he rejects her replying that he has never seen her in that way. He begins to avoid her and soon finds out she is now a drug addict and has attempted suicide. His guilt persuaded him to allow Pallavi to call Uma, as he believed Uma also was heading in Christie's direction.

Uma realizes that even though Pallavi can still be his, it is only right that she stays with Arun. He forces Chandramouli and stages a play where he himself looks like a negative person to Pallavi and coaxes her into realizing Arun's honesty. Arun prepares to leave the house, believing Pallavi would be happy, but she does not allow him to do so, and they clear up their misunderstanding with Arun telling Pallavi that he loves only her. As they embrace at their reunion, Uma is heartbroken and walks out of the house, crying and shattered. A year later, he arrives in Vizag and meets Pallavi and Arun, who now have a daughter, and reveals he has come to meet a girl he met online, hoping to settle and marry.

Cast 
Nani as P. Uma Maheswara Rao "Uma"
Nivetha Thomas as Pallavi
Aadhi Pinisetty as Arun
Murali Sharma as Chandramouli, Pallavi's father
Tanikella Bharani as Murthy, Uma's mentor
Prudhviraj as Lovababu, Pallavi's brother-in-law
Rajasree Nair  as Pallavi's mother
Mounica as Pallavi's elder sister
Vidyullekha Raman as Kavitha, Pallavi's friend
Kedar Shankar as Arun's father
Shivakumar Ramachandravarapu 
Vineet Chandra 
Anirudh Kasturi as Suresh, Arun's friend

Music 

Music of the film was composed by Gopi Sunder. This is his third collaboration with Nani.

Release 
Ninnu Kori was released on 7 July 2017. Later, a Hyderabad-Mumbai based production company, Aditya Movies bought the Hindi dubbing rights of the film. It is dubbed into Hindi as Aaj Ka Khiladi in 2020 which is to have a direct premiere on TV channel. Sony Networks bought the satellite rights of the Hindi dubbed version.

Reception 
Sowmya Shruthi of The Times of India rated three out of five and wrote "Ninnu Kori is an entertainer with lots of drama and emotion with just the right amount of laughter thrown in," while adding that "Nani, Aadhi and Nivetha breathe life in their characters and you can't think of anybody else playing those roles with such ease and conviction."

Firstpost's Hemanth Kumar gave 3.5/5 and praised the film for its well written characters. "Ninnu Kori is a character-driven film and Shiva Nirvana invests plenty of time in developing each of the characters who have to deal with their share of pain and turbulence in their lives", Kumar stated. He also added that "[the film] drives home the notion that love is transient and that in pursuit of happiness, you learn to move on from your past."

Sangeetha Devi Dundoo writing for The Hindu opined that "The film is a contemporary take on relationships." Priyanka Sundar of The Indian Express rated two stars out of five, by writing "Shiva Nirvana has presented a love story which initially looked refreshing, but as minutes pass by, the film is too much of stretch with a few laughs thrown in."

Awards and nominations

Remakes 
Ninnu Kori was remade in Tamil as Thalli Pogathey in 2021 by R. Kannan starring Atharvaa, Anupama Parameswaran and Amitash Pradhan.

References

External links
 

2017 films
2010s Telugu-language films
Films scored by Gopi Sundar
Films set in the United States
Films shot in the United States
2017 romantic comedy-drama films
Telugu films remade in other languages
2017 directorial debut films
Indian romantic comedy-drama films
Films set in Andhra Pradesh
Films shot in Andhra Pradesh
Films shot in Visakhapatnam
Films set in Visakhapatnam
Films directed by Shiva Nirvana